Perrilloux is a surname. Notable people with the surname include:

Ryan Perrilloux (born 1987), American football player
Scott Perrilloux, American district attorney for Louisiana's 21st judicial district